In Poland, the common courts, according to article 177 of the Constitution, are the courts of general jurisdiction, i.e. they rule on all cases in which the jurisdiction has not been explicitly transferred to other courts. This includes a broad range of cases, including civil, criminal, labour, economic and insurance law. The other types of courts recognised in Poland are administrative courts and military courts. The territorial jurisdiction of these courts and their creation is regulated by the minister of justice. 

Poland has a three-tier system of common courts. Most of the cases land in one of 318 regional courts, whose rulings may be appealed to 47 district courts. The latter courts also hear some cases in their original jurisdiction, which tend to be cases where high sums of money are disputed, the ones about serious crimes, and some that deal with narrow subjects, like intellectual property, surveillance, competition law, and personal rights. District court rulings issued in the original jurisdiction may be appealed to an appeal court; despite the name, the appeal courts will also serve as the courts of original jurisdiction in disciplinary cases against common court judges. After the courts of two instances have reviewed their cases, a cassation or its equivalent may be lodged in the Supreme Court.

Apart from their strictly judicial duties, the common courts in Poland maintain several registries. The National Court Register (Krajowy Rejestr Sądowy) maintains information about most companies in Poland; other such databases include the land and mortgage registry, the register of press outlets, the register of political parties, the register of pension and investment funds, the registry of ships, and the register of pledges.

Sąd rejonowy 

A sąd rejonowy, translated by the Ministry of Justice into regional court, or, by some other organisations, into district court, is the trial court for the vast majority of cases, reviewing them by default unless the authority was transferred to a higher court. In fact, according to the Statistical Yearbook of the Republic of Poland, out of about 14,381,500 cases solved in Poland in 2020, about 13,477,800 originated in these courts. There are currently 318 such courts, each normally spanning several gminas; however, some large cities, like Warsaw, Kraków, Łódź, Wrocław, Poznań, Gdańsk, Szczecin, Lublin and Katowice, are split between two or more such courts. The Minister of Justice, as authorised by article 19 of the Law on the organisation of common courts, may create through a regulation a local branch division of a sąd rejonowy located in a town other than the main seat of the court and consisting of replicated divisions mirroring those operating at the main seat (either all or selected), with both locations supported by a single administrative apparatus.

All such courts hear trials in at least three divisions (wydziały): a civil (cywilny), a criminal (karny) and a family and minors (rodzinny i nieletnich) one. In addition to that, the courts based in the cities that at the same time host a sąd okręgowy or other located in a city with powiat rights also include an economic (gospodarczy) division; and in most cases also a labour and social insurance (pracy i ubezpieczeń społecznych) division. If a dispute (e.g. between two companies or between an employer and an employee) occurs within the jurisdiction of a court without the relevant chamber, the case must be tried in the nearest court that includes it (as indicated by the minister of justice - this often happens to be the seat of the sąd okręgowy). Since 1 January 2020, some courts may also create an enforcement division (wydział egzekucyjny), dealing mostly with enforcing court's orders to seize assets in order to cover liabilities. Additionally, one of the two regional courts for Lublin additionally operates a nationwide civil division for cases filed using a simplified procedure of the electronic writ of payment, regardless of the sum in dispute.

Most regional courts also have land and mortgage registry divisions (wydział ksiąg wieczystych), which record various transactions with respect to real estate and land titles. 21 courts in largest cities additionally operate 27 (duplicate in the cases of the busiest courts) economic divisions designated specifically for maintaining the National Court Register (Krajowy Rejestr Sądowy), which is the company register for all companies except those formed under sole proprietorship, and 52 courts operate an information point providing access to and excerpts from data of the Register. These, however, they have been losing importance, as the Register may nowadays be searched online free of charge.

In addition, 11 courts (serving the cities where appeal courts are located) maintain also a further economic division, designated for operating the  containing entries on all registered pledges and voluntary liens granted on collaterals other than real estate, but ship mortgage and maritime liens are entered in a separate Registry of Ships. In addition, the Register of Pledges does not cover collaterals under tax liens, registered in the separate  operated by the National Revenue Administration.

Sąd okręgowy 

A sąd okręgowy, also translated inconsistently, with variants including circuit, provincial or regional court (the Polish MoJ translates the name into district court), is higher in the hierarchy of the common courts compared to the sąd rejonowy. There are currently 47 district courts, located mainly in larger cities; the newest one in Sosnowiec was opened on 1 April 2022. Warsaw is the only city to be split between two district courts (Warsaw and Warsaw-Praga district courts). In 2020, they heard an estimated 808,600 cases.

The district court serves both as a court of original jurisdiction and appellate jurisdiction. As an appellate court, it hears appeals from the sąd rejonowy courts within its territory (known as okręg). There is also a specified catalogue of cases where the court has original jurisdiction, as determined by law. As a rule of thumb, these will tend to be cases with high sums at stake, those about serious crimes, and those about intellectual property and personal rights. Some of the items are listed below:

 lawsuits claiming more than 75,000 PLN of worth, with some exceptions (article 17 section 4 of the Code of Civil Procedure, KPC). The calculation of the sum at dispute depends on the type of case being processed.
 lawsuits concerning personal rights (e.g. personality rights, right to privacy, defamation, freedom of conscience cases, etc.), except for parenthood and adoption cases (article 17 section 1 of KPC)
 press law lawsuits (article 17 section 1 of KPC);
 complaints challenging the split of a cooperative, or the legal effect of resolutions of legal persons and other entities with legal capacity (article 17 sections 41-2 of KPC)
 applications claiming damages for the effects of a binding (i.e. non-appealable) court verdict which was against the law (article 17 sections 44 of KPC);
 indictments for serious crimes, as specified in article 25 section 1 of the Code of Criminal Procedure (KPK);
 civil lawsuits referred from a sąd rejonowy for trial in a district court (may be remanded to sąd rejonowy, with justification), and criminal lawsuits that are referred from the appeal court on regional court's request (article 18 of KPC and article 25 section 2 of KPK).

The district courts always include a criminal and a civil division, as well as a labour and social insurance division; some may additionally have a commercial division as well as an inspection division (wydział wizytacyjny) tasked with administrative auditing and oversight of the subordinate courts; a penitentiary division for cases related to prisons, an execution division with similar roles to sąd rejonowy court's enforcement division, and others according to the court's needs as determined by the minister of justice. The district courts will often feature separate appellate sections or, in the case of smaller courts, appeal panels within the sections. They are authorised to issue European arrest warrants (article 607a of KPK) and maintain a list of court experts for the district.

Selected district courts will handle cases in some niche domains. Intellectual property lawsuits, on the basis of article 47990 of KPC, are heard in five district courts, with the most complicated cases heard exclusively in Warsaw. The Warsaw district court additionally reviews telecommunications, postal or Internet data surveillance requests from the central government organs, such as ABW or CBA. The Szczecin and Gdańsk district courts have affiliated quasi-judicial bodies named  (in Szczecin and in Gdynia, respectively), and the latter court features an appellate maritime chamber.

Sąd apelacyjny 

Sąd apelacyjny (translated as appeal court by the Ministry of Justice), as the name suggests, primarily functions in appellate jurisdiction. These 11 courts hear appeals from rulings made by a common sąd okręgowy court in its original jurisdiction; additionally, they hear requests to cancel a decision of a Polish arbitration court (article 1208 of ), and generally review appeals from rulings of quasi-judicial bodies of some statutory professional regulatory colleges of the so-called self-regulating professions, unless these by law are subject to cassation to the Supreme Court. Each appeal court also has an affiliated disciplinary court hearing in the first instance the majority of charges against common court justices. Its verdicts can be appealed to the Disciplinary Chamber of the Supreme Court, with the exception of the most grave cases specified in the Polish Supreme Court Disciplinary Chamber law, heard both in first and in second instance by that Supreme Court chamber.

Three divisions are normally formed within these courts: the criminal division, the labour and social insurance division and the civil division, which hears appeals from verdicts in civil, family, economic law and intellectual law lawsuits. An inspection chamber may also be formed for auditing and oversight of the subordinate courts within the appeal court's jurisdiction (known in Polish as apelacja, not to be confused with another meaning of this word, namely, an appeal). The court is tasked with making a budget of all the courts within its jurisdiction and control the expenditures of the district and regional courts.

Notes

References 

Judiciary of Poland